Love Is Love/Return to Dust, the debut album of American band Code Orange Kids
 Return to Dust (film), directed by Li Ruijun